Murad Ibrahim may refer to:
 Al-Hajj Murad Ebrahim (born 1948), Filipino Islamist
Murad Ibrahim (footballer) (born 1987), Bulgarian footballer